Rancho Nicasio was a Mexican land grant of  granted to the Coast Miwok indigenous people in 1835, located in the present-day Marin County, California, a tract of land that stretched from San Geronimo to Tomales Bay.  Today, Nicasio, California is at the heart of this location.

History
In the mid-1830s, lands were promised by General Mariano Vallejo to the San Rafael Indians, whose land had been co-opted by the Mission San Rafael. When asked what land they wanted, the Coast Miwok chiefs chose
 ranging from Nicasio Valley to the area surrounding Tomales. The land was granted by Mexican Governor José Figueroa to the Coast Miwok of Marin County in 1835, but the Miwok claim was rejected by the Public Land Commission in 1855. 

In 1844, Governor Manuel Micheltorena granted the  Rancho Nicasio to Pablo de la Guerra and John B.R. Cooper.  By 1849, there were three owners  — Pablo de la Guerra, Cooper, and Jasper O’Farrell. In 1850 Pablo de la Guerra sold his  undivided share of the ranch to Henry Wager Halleck. Halleck had arrived in California in 1847 as a lieutenant in the United States Engineers, accompanied by his friend, Lt. William Tecumseh Sherman. Halleck was a partner in the San Francisco law firm, Halleck, Peachy & Billings, and in the Civil War was promoted by President Abraham Lincoln to general-in-chief of the armies of the United States. Halleck hunted and fished at Rancho Nicasio, and built a house on the creek near Nicasio, now called Halleck Creek. In 1850, Cooper sold his  undivided share of the ranch to Benjamin Rush Buckelew. Besides Cooper’s share of Rancho Nicasio, Buckelew also purchased Cooper’s Rancho Punta de Quentin and John Reed’s Rancho Corte Madera del Presidio.  In 1851, O’Farrell sold his  share to James Black, the grantee of Rancho Cañada de Jonive. In 1852 Buckelew sold  to William Reynolds and Daniel Frink.

With the cession of California to the United States following the Mexican-American War, the 1848 Treaty of Guadalupe Hidalgo provided that the land grants would be honored.  As required by the Land Act of 1851, a claim for Rancho Nicasio was filed with the Public Land Commission in 1852, and the grant patented to Black, Buckelew, Halleck, and Reynolds and Frink in 1870.

Black later bought Halleck’s share of Rancho Nicasio.  Black also bought Rancho Olompali from Camilo Ynitia, the last Olompali Indian chief, in 1852.  Black's daughter, Mary, married Dr. Galen Burdell.  Black's wife, Maria Agustina Sais, died in Dr. Burdell's dental chair in 1864.   In 1866 Black married Maria Loreto Duarte, Ygnacio Pacheco’s widow.  James Black died in 1870.

See also
Ranchos of California
List of Ranchos of California

References
 Jane Futcher (text) and Robert Conover (photographs). 1983. Marin: The Place, the People, Profile of a California County. Holt, Rinehart and Winston 
 Hoover, Mildred Brooke, Douglas E. Kyle, and Hero Rensch. 2002. Historic spots in California, Fifth edition, Stanford University Press. .
 Miller, George. 2000. Additional Views, 106th Congress Report: House of Representatives, 2d Session, 106-677, Graton Rancheria Restoration Act 
 Papina, Anne M. 2008. Nicasio (Arcadia Publishing, 2008).

Notes 

Nicasio
Nicasio
West Marin